Malaya Marcelino is a Canadian politician, who was elected to the Legislative Assembly of Manitoba in the 2019 Manitoba general election. She represents the electoral district of Notre Dame as a member of the Manitoba New Democratic Party.

She is the daughter of former MLA Flor Marcelino.

Election results

References

New Democratic Party of Manitoba MLAs
Women MLAs in Manitoba
Canadian politicians of Filipino descent
Living people
21st-century Canadian politicians
Politicians from Winnipeg
Year of birth missing (living people)
21st-century Canadian women politicians